Frahang-i Oīm-Ēwak is an old Avestan-Middle Persian dictionary. It is named with the two first words of the dictionary: oīm in Avestan means 'one' and ēwak is its Pahlavi equivalent. It gives the Pahlavi meanings of about 880 Avestan words, either by one word or one phrase or by explaining it.

References

External links
 Raham Asha: Avesta Glossary. A glossary of Avesta words and their Pārsīg equivalents, based on the Zand, the so-called Frahang ī ōīm:ēk. Text and Grammatical Notes. Mumbai, The K. R. Cama Oriental Institute, 2009.

Zoroastrian texts
Avestan dictionaries and grammars
Persian dictionaries
Middle Persian literature